Frothar or Frotar (Latin Frotharius, French Frotaire) is a Frankish given name and may refer to:
 Frothar of Toul, bishop of Toul 847
 Frothar (archbishop of Bordeaux) (before 859after 893)
 , bishop of Nîmes 9871016
 , 11th century bishop of Nîmes